The 2012–13 PFF National Men's Club Championship (also known as 2012–13 PFF–Smart National Club Championship) was the 2nd season of the PFF National Men's Club Championship, a Filipino association football competition organized by the Philippine Football Federation.

Global Teknika were the defending champions.

On February 2, 2013, Ceres defeated PSG with a 1–0 scoreline to win the title.

Competition format
Similar to the previous tournament, the Smart National Club championships this year had cluster and regional eliminations outside of Manila and the quarterfinal matches were hosted in the provinces. There were two clusters for Luzon, one for Visayas, four for Mindanao and one for the National Capital Region. After the cluster eliminations, there was a Luzon, Visayas and Mindanao eliminations, where the top two teams advanced to the quarterfinal round along with the top 10 teams that were participating in the UFL Cup. There was another drawing of lots for the quarterfinal round and if a provincial team faced a UFL club, that game will be hosted by the provincial football associations. The Provincial Football Association (PFA) teams who made the quarterfinal round was given a transfer window to allow teams to add or drop eight players for their 25-man squad. This was done to help boost the provincial teams.

Teams played in a single round-robin format with the top teams advancing to the regional eliminations. Top two teams from each group advanced to the Round of 16, the start of the knockout stage, wherein they were joined by the top 10 UFL teams. In the Round of 16, qualified teams were divided into two groups. The top 8 UFL teams comprised the first group and the remaining two UFL teams joined the six regional qualifiers from Luzon, Visayas and Mindanao in the second group. Only two matches were played in Manila as the rest were played in the provinces. If a provincial team drew a UFL team, the match will be played in their turf. The top eight teams from the Round of 16 advanced to the quarterfinals, top four to the semifinals and top two to the finals.

Top two teams in Mindanao joined top two teams of Luzon, top two teams from Visayas and top ten United Football League teams for the round of 16 which started on 12 January 2012. The tournament will also serve as a qualifying process of teams which have plans to join the country’s premier football league – the United Football League (UFL).

Qualifying round
Member Associations (MA) of the Philippine Football Federation organized their own tournaments as part of Provincial Qualifying Rounds to determine their representatives to the Group Stages.

National Capital Region Cluster
Top ten teams of the 2012 UFL Cup from National Capital Region F.A. moved to the knockout stages.

General Trias International FC 1
Global
Green Archers United
Kaya
Loyola
Manila Nomads
Pachanga Diliman
PSG
Philippine Army
Stallion 2
1 Competing as a guest club in the UFL; General Trias International FC is a member of Cavite Football Association.  2 Competing as a Division 1 club in the UFL; Stallion is a member of Iloilo Football Association.

Luzon Cluster

North, Central and South Luzon cluster eliminations were held in La Trinidad, Benguet on October 17, 2012.

Baguio United FC represents Baguio City Football Association 
Football Association of Tarlac
Flame United FC represents Cavite Football Association
LB United FC represents Laguna Football Association
San Beda FC represents Football Association of Rizal
Adriatico FC represents Oriental Mindoro Football Association

Southeast Luzon cluster eliminations were held in Naga City
Camarines Norte Football Association
Legaspi City-Albay Federated Football Association
Federated Football Association of Masbate
ABC Stars FC represents Naga City-Camarines Sur Football Association
Quezon Football Association
University of Batangas FC represents Football Association of Batangas

Visayas Cluster
Visayas region with its lone cluster held its regional elimination in San Carlos City. 
Cebu Queen City United, winner of the 14th Aboitiz Cup Men’s Open, represents Cebu Football Association. 
Ceres represents Negros Occidental Football Association. 
Iloilo Football Association
Baybay FC, winner of the KULAS Cup last August 4–5, 2012, represents Leyte Football Association 
Negros Oriental Football Association

Iloilo Football Association and Negros Oriental Football Association withdrew participation later on.

Ceres and Cebu Queen City United qualified for the knockout stages.

Mindanao Cluster
Mindanao hosted the most number of cluster elimination rounds, taking place in Malaybalay on 17 October 2012 while South Cotabato and Dipolog commenced thereafter. Davao City commenced their qualification matches earlier, on October 3, 2012. 16 football associations in the Mindanao region took part.

North Mindanao cluster was held in Malaybalay City.
Malaybalay United FC represents Bukidnon Football Association 
Cuartel FC represents Butuan-Agusan del Norte Football Association 
Montecarlo FC represents Cagayan de Oro-Misamis Oriental Football Association 
Advocates FC represents Iligan-Lanao del Norte Football Association 
Surigao City FC represents Surigao del Norte Football Association

Central Mindanao cluster was held in South Cotabato.
Maguindanao-Cotabato City Football Association 
M'lang FC represents North Cotabato Football Association 
Real Marbel FC represents Football Association of South Cotabato 
Sultan Kudarat Football Association

South Mindanao cluster was held in Davao City. 
Hooligans FC represents Davao Football Association
PNP FC represents Davao del Norte Football Association.

West Mindanao cluster was held in Dipolog.
Misamis Occidental-Ozamiz City Football Association
Alberei FC represents Zamboanga Football Association
Romgarjal FC represents Zamboanga del Norte-Dipolog Football Association
Zamboanga del Sur-Pagadian Football Association

Regional Championships
Games were played in single round-robin format where winners and runners-up advanced to the next round.

All times are Philippine Standard Time (PST) – UTC+8.

All-Luzon Championship
Luzon will stage their regional eliminations in Laguna. Winners and runners-up from both Luzon clusters will advance to the All-Luzon Championship and will compete in single-round robin format.

Flame United FC of Cavite Football Association, winner of North, Central and South Luzon cluster eliminations
Baguio United FC of Baguio Football Association, runner-up of North, Central and South Luzon cluster eliminations
Federated Football Association of Masbate
ABC Stars FC of Naga City-Camarines Sur Football Association

3 No data.

All-Mindanao Championship
Mindanao will stage their regional eliminations in Davao City. Winners from the four Mindanao clusters will advance to the All-Mindanao Championship and will compete in single-round robin format.

Advocates FC of Iligan-Lanao del Norte Football Association, winner of North Mindanao cluster eliminations
Hooligans FC of Davao Football Association, winner of South Mindanao cluster eliminations.
M’Lang FC, winner of Central Mindanao qualifiers
Ramgarjal FC of Zamboanga del Norte-Dipolog Football Association, winner of Western Mindanao qualifiers

Advocates FC back out at the last minute, leaving three clubs in the regional eliminations.

Knockout stage
The draw for the qualified teams from regional qualifiers was made at the Philippine Football Federation headquarters on 7 December 2012. Knock-out stages was held starting January 19, 2013.

Round of 16

All times are Philippine Standard Time (PST) – UTC+8.

Quarter-finals

Semi-finals

Third place

Finals

Top goalscorers
Top Goal Scorers starting Round of 16.

Correct as of 21:00, February 2, 2013

Awards
The following were the competition’s top individual awardees.
Fair Play Award: Green Archers United
Golden Boot:  Chieffy Caligdong
Most Valuable Player:  Byeong Yun Joon
Best Defender:  Kyeon Hyeong Park
Best Midfielder:  Joshua Beloya
Golden Gloves:  Jae Hun Hyeon

References

PFF National Men's Club Championship seasons
2013 in Philippine football
2012 in Philippine football